Pinaki Thakur (21 April 1959 – 3 January 2019) was a Bengali poet

Biography
Thakur was born in 1959 at Bansberia, Hooghly district in the Indian state of West Bengal. He studied Engineering but was passionate in Bengali poetry from student life and wrote poems in various little magazines. His poetry was first published in Ushinar magazine in 1974. In 1979 Thakur's poetry was published in Desh magazine. He became popular in Bengali literary field after publishing his first book Ekdin Ashoriri. Thakur was conferred the Ananda Puraskar in 2012 for his book Chumbaner Kkhato. He was also awarded by Paschimbanga Bangla Akademi Puraskar and Krittibas Purashkar. He was suffering from cerebral malaria since December 2018 and died on 3 January 2019 in SSKM Hospital, Kolkata at the age of 59.

Books
 Ekdin Ashoriri
 Ha Re Shaswata
 Anke Joto Shunyo Pele
 Chumbaner Kkhato
 Amara Roilam
 Sharir Kancher Tukro
 Basanta Mastan
 Nishiddho Ek Ganer Moto
 Mausam
 Kalanka Rachana
 Akal Basanta
 Kabita Samgra

References

1959 births
2019 deaths
Bengali-language writers
20th-century Bengali poets
21st-century Bengali poets
Bengali male poets
Poets from West Bengal
Recipients of the Ananda Purashkar
Bengali Hindus
20th-century Bengalis
21st-century Bengalis
People from Hooghly district
20th-century Indian poets
Indian poets
21st-century Indian poets
Indian male poets
Writers from Kolkata